MV Iron Baron may refer to:

 , a bulk carrier of BHP Shipping which ran aground in 1995

See also
 Iron Baron (disambiguation)